Return to the Field (歸田賦 Gui tian fu) is a literary work written in the Chinese style known as a rhapsody, or fu style: it is by Zhang Heng (AD 78–139), an official, inventor, mathematician, and astronomer of the Han Dynasty of China (202 BC–220 AD). Zhang's Return to the Field is a seminal work in the Fields and Gardens poetry genre which helped to sparked centuries of poetic enthusiasm for poems of various forms which share a common theme of nature foremost with human beings and human thought seemingly not in main focus, somewhat similar to the Landscape poetry genre; however, in the case of the Fields and Gardens genre, nature was focused upon in its more domestic manifestation, paying homage to the appearance of nature in gardens, as found in backyards, and cultivated in the countryside. Return to the Field also invokes traditional themes of Classical Chinese poetry involving nature versus society.

Background
Return to the Field was written as Zhang rejoicefully went into retirement in 138, after retiring from the corrupted politics of the capital Luoyang and then serving a post as administrator over Hejian Kingdom. His poem reflected the life he wished to lead in retirement while emphasizing markedly Daoist ideas over his Confucian background. Liu Wu-chi writes that by combining Daoist ideas with Confucian ones, Zhang's poem "heralded the metaphysical verse and nature poetry of the later centuries." In the rhapsody, Zhang also explicitly mentions the sage of Daoism, Laozi (fl. 6th century BC), as well as Confucius (6th century BC), the Duke of Zhou (fl. 11th century BC), and the Three Sovereigns.

Rhapsody selection
A section about spring in Zhang Heng's rhapsody, translated in Liu Wu-chi's book An Introduction to Chinese Literature (1990), reads as thus:

See also
Classical Chinese poetry
Fu (poetry)
Han poetry

Notes

References
de Crespigny, Rafe. (2007). A Biographical Dictionary of Later Han to the Three Kingdoms (23-220 AD). Leiden: Koninklijke Brill. .
Liu, Wu-chi. (1990). An Introduction to Chinese Literature. Westport: Greenwood Press of Greenwood Publishing Group. .
Neinhauser, William H., Charles Hartman, Y.W. Ma, and Stephen H. West. (1986). The Indiana Companion to Traditional Chinese Literature: Volume 1. Bloomington: Indiana University Press. .

Han dynasty texts
Han dynasty literature
Chinese poems
Taoist texts
Confucian texts